Two ships of the Imperial Japanese Navy were named Tsukuba:

 , a screw corvette launched in 1853 as HMS Malacca she was acquired by Japan about 1890 and renamed. She was stricken in 1906 
 , a  launched in 1905 and sunk in 1917

Imperial Japanese Navy ship names
Japanese Navy ship names